The Redcar Bears are a British speedway team who currently compete in the SGB Championship (middle tier of the British speedway leagues). Their major team honour to date is the SGB Championship KO Cup  win in 2019 against rivals Newcastle Diamonds. The team also run a junior side called the Redcar Cubs and the Teesside Tigers.

History
The Bears started life as the Cleveland Bays during the 1994 British League Division Three season, they finished as runner-up before entering the 1995 but failed to complete the season and withdrew from the league.

It was not until 2006 that speedway returned to Middlesbrough, with a new team name of Redcar Bear racing at the purpose built South Tees Motorsports Park. The team entered the 2006 Premier League speedway season, the Premier League was division 2 at the time. In 2007, the Bears won the Premier League consolation tournament the Young Shield, beating the Birmingham Brummies.

From 2008 to 2016 the team continued to compete in the Premier League with a best placed finish of 5th in 2009. In 2017, the team joined the SGB Championship (the new name for division 2) and finished in 5th place. The Bears were awarded the 2017 Championship Track of the Year by the Speedway Control Board, an award voted for throughout the season based on referee's match reports.

In 2019, Jitendra Duffill became co-promoter replacing Kevin Keay, with Jade Mudgway continuing as the team manager and co-promoter. Former World Speedway Champion and Redcar rider Gary Havelock also re-joined the club as rider coach. Race nights switched to Friday from Thursday and the club were branded as the Redcar Agilia Bears after London based company Agilia Infrastructure Partners Limited became the club's main sponsor. During the 2019 season, the Bears beat Newcastle Diamonds in the Championship Knockout Cup final. Additionally Bears' rider Charles Wright became the 2019 British Speedway Champion after winning the final at the National Speedway Stadium in Manchester and Erik Riss won his first Championship Riders title at Sheffield.

For the 2020 season the Bears retained five of the previous years team but the season was cancelled due to the COVID-19.

2021 saw the Bears lose their reign as K.O. Cup holders in Preliminary Round defeat to the Birmingham Brummies and despite qualifying for the end of season Play-Offs, were beaten in the Quarter Finals by the Edinburgh Monarchs.

In 2022 a new name was announced for the South Tees Motorsports Park as The ECCO Arena, after long-time sponsor ECCO Finishing Supplies snapped up the opportunity to take over the stadium naming rights. The first silverware of the SGB Championship 2022 went to the Redcar pairing of Charles Wright and Lewis Kerr who lifted the SGB Championship 2022 Pairs Championship held at Oxford on Friday 12 August. Also in August, Katie Gordon who rides for the Redcar Cubs won the inaugural NORA Women's British Championship held over a series of 3 events with a winner takes all final at the home of the Wight Warriors on the Isle of Wight.

League history
1994 – British League (div 3) – 2nd; (as Cleveland Bays)
1995 – Academy League – withdrew; (as Cleveland Bays)
2006 – Premier League – 6th;
2007 – Premier League – 9th;
2008 – Premier League – 7th;
2008 – Conference League – 3rd; (as Redcar Cubs)
2009 – Premier League – 5th;
2010 – Premier League – 14th;
2011 – Premier League – 10th;
2012 – Premier League – 9th;
2013 – Premier League – 6th;
2014 – Premier League – 10th;
2015 – Premier League – 13th;
2016 – Premier League – 13th;
2017 – Championship – 5th;
2018 – Championship – 10th;
2019 – Championship – 3rd; play off semi finals
2020 – Cancelled due to Coronavirus pandemic;
2021 – Championship – 4th;
2022 – Championship - 6th, PO QF;

Riders

Notable riders

Previous seasons

2006 Team

2007 Team

Also Rode:

2008 Team

Also Rode:

2009 Team

2010 Team=

2011 Team

2012 Team

 - No.3 was previously Gary Havelock but Wilkinson signed due to Havelock's injury. 
 
 
 
 - Replaced Robert Branford

2013 Team

 
 
 

2014 Team

 
 
 

Also Rode:

2015 Team

 

 

Also Rode:

2016 Team

 

 

Also Rode:
 

2017 Team

 Jason Garrity
 Ben Barker
 Charles Wright
 Jonas B Andersen
 Tobias Busch
 Danny Ayres
 Ellis Perks

Also Rode:
Coty Garcia
Replaced Tobias Busch on a 28-day loan period.
 Richard Hall
Replaced by Danny Ayres 17 May 2017.

2017 Competitions & Results

2018 Team

 Ben Barker
 Thomas Jørgensen
 Dimitri Bergé
 Jonas B Andersen
 Mikkel B Andersen
 Jordan Stewart
 Nike Lunna

Also rode:
 - Replaced 31 May 2018 by Thomas Jørgensen 
 - Replaced 3 June 2018 by Dimitri Bergé
  - On a 28-day contract replacing Tobias Busch 3 June 2018 – 5 July 2018 
  - Replaced 9 August 2018 by Nike Lunna 

Jade Mudgway deputised for Team Manager Jitendra Duffill.

2018 Competitions & Results

2019 Team

 Erik Riss (2019 Championship Riders Champion)
 Kasper Andersen
 Jordan Stewart
 Charles Wright (2019 British Speedway Champion)
 Michael Palm Toft
 Nathan Greaves
 Tom Woolley

Also Rode:
 Ben Barker replaced 4/6/19 by Ulrich Ostergaard 
 Ulrich Ostergaard replaced by Erik Riss 3/7/19 
 Tom Bacon replaced by Kasper Andersen 3/7/19
 Jack Smith replaced by Tom Woolley 3/7/19

3 July 2019 changes

2019 Competitions & Results

2020 Team

 Charles Wright
 Erik Riss
 Michael Palm Toft
 Jordan Stewart
 Kasper Andersen
 Joe Lawlor
 Jordan Jenkins

2021 Team

 Charles Wright
 Michael Palm Toft
 Jake Allen
 Jordan Stewart
 Anders Rowe
 James Sarjeant
 Jordan Jenkins

2022 Team
 Charles Wright
 Erik Riss
 Lewis Kerr
 Kasper Andersen
 Jordan Jenkins
 Jason Edwards
 Kyle Newman

Also Rode:
Adam Roynon
Replaced by Kyle Bickley 4/7/22.
Kyle Bickley
Replaced by Kyle Newman 11/8/22.

References

Speedway Premier League teams
SGB Championship teams
Sport in Middlesbrough